Robert Flynn (né Robert Lopez Flynn; born 12 April 1932, in Chillicothe, Texas) is an author and professor emeritus at Trinity University.

Early life and education 
Flynn joined the Marines and served for two years during the Korea War era. In 1954, he received drama degree from Baylor University. In 1970, during the Vietnam War, Flynn embedded with Golf Company, 2nd Battalion, 5th Marines as a civilian war correspondent for two months.

Styles and themes
Flynn's early fame came with the novel, North to Yesterday, which was a national bestseller.It mocked the legend of the cowboy in Western novels while paying homage to it at the same time.. Later works focused on more modern themes: rural life, going to war, religion in modern times and conflicts between "small town morality" and mass media/pop culture.

Novels like In the House of the Lord explored more religious/spiritual themes. Wanderer Springs adopted the gently satirical tone of his earlier works while also examining the interconnectedness between people and families in a small Texas town.  The Last Klick touches upon themes of his service in the Vietnam War. (In his latest novel Tie-Fast Country, Flynn returns to earlier themes, depicting a grandmother rancher with a checkered past who is out of sync with contemporary life. (The narrator is a TV news producer who has to confront her).

Flynn's short stories touch upon more serious themes and are written perhaps with a more lyrical style.

In 2010 and 2011, Flynn  published two novels through JoSara MeDia, Jade:Outlaw and its sequel, Jade: the Law. Both novels portray the grim realities of living in west Texas in the late 19th century where settlers/Indians/Mexicans frequently clash. Jade, the protagonist, is hired as an  escort for cattle, guarding property and chasing after rustlers. He quickly discovers that just to do his job means getting involved in brutal situations that trouble his conscience. Jade ends up falling in love with Crow Poison, an Indian woman whose husband he had killed. Eventually he realizes that both sides have culpability. His outrage translates into a desire to fight for the sake of justice (even if it results in tragedy). At the end of the novel, Jade (with the support of his wife) agrees to serve as sheriff for his town (which becomes the basis for the sequel, Jade: The Law). Of this ebook, San Antonio Express News book reviewer Ed Conroy writes: "Flynn brilliantly employs a directly simple, subtle and at times sardonic narrative voice to tell this tale. It is alternately tough and tender, succinct and sweet, cadenced to the clip-clop of a horse trotting down Main Street, the hullabaloo of a steam locomotive triumphantly making its way into town amid a jubilant crowd's hoopla, and, of course, to the shots of guns of many kinds fired in self-defense, anger, treachery and haste....Through chronicling Jade's struggles to bring some ordinary order into what eventually becomes Jade Town, Flynn makes clear that the cost of many of our male ancestors' genocidal policies toward Indians, systematic abuse of women and fears of the "mongrelization" of the "white race" was massive social trauma of immensely tragic proportions."

Flynn was inducted into the Texas Literary Hall of Fame in October 2012.

Flynn taught writing to college students over four decades. In a 2007 audio interview, he said,  "You can read any book on writing fiction for example, and they will tell you the same thing. Someone may say it in a different way that gives you better insight, but there are  no secrets in writing; it's just a matter of doing it."

Bibliography

Novels
North To Yesterday
In the House of the Lord
The Sounds of Rescue, The Signs of Hope
Wanderer Springs
The Last Klick
The Devil's Tiger, with Dan Klepper
Tie-Fast Country
Jade: The Outlaw (ebook + pb) JoSara MeDia (September 1, 2010)
Jade: The Law (ebook + pb) JoSara MeDia (October 2011)

Vietnam Memoir
A Personal War In Vietnam

Short story collections
Living with the Hyenas
Seasonal Rain
Slouching towards Zion

Essays
When I was Just Your Age, oral histories, edited with Susan Russell
Growing Up a Sullen Baptist
Paul Baker and the Integration of Abilities

Religious/social essays
The Most Famous Christian of the 20th century?
For the love of Agape

References

Further reading
Art at Our Doorstep: San Antonio Writers and Artists featuring Robert Flynn. Edited by Nan Cuba and Riley Robinson (Trinity University Press, 2008).

External links
 Interview with Robert Flynn(about his book Growing Up a Sullen Baptist).
 The Door: The World's Pretty Much Only Magazine of Religious Satire. Essay by Robert Flynn.
Robert Flynn's Author Website 
2007 Interview with Texas Author Robert Flynn (audio)
2019 humorous reading  at  PechaKucha San Antonio Vol. 36. Subject was growing up as a  Southern Baptist from the small town of Chillicothe, Texas. (video)

1932 births
Living people
20th-century American novelists
21st-century American novelists
American male novelists
American war correspondents of the Vietnam War
Western (genre) writers
Writers from San Antonio
Novelists from Texas
People from Chillicothe, Texas
United States Marines
20th-century American male writers
21st-century American male writers